Ride Like Hell is an EP album by Canadian rock band Big Sugar.  It was released in 1995 on Hypnotic Records.

Track listing
"Ride Like Hell"
"Dear Mr. Fantasy"
"I'm a Ram"
"Burning Bush (Ram Dub)"
"Cass Corridor (Ram Chroma Dub)"

Big Sugar albums
1995 EPs